Giresun Atatürk Stadium is a multi-purpose stadium in Giresun, Turkey.  It is currently used mostly for football matches and is the home ground of TFF First League team Giresunspor.

The stadium was built in 1941 and currently holds 12191 people.

References

External links
Giresun Atatürk Stadyumu

Football venues in Turkey
Multi-purpose stadiums in Turkey
Buildings and structures in Giresun Province
Sports venues completed in 1941
Things named after Mustafa Kemal Atatürk